Calochortus ambiguus, the Arizona mariposa lily or doubting mariposa lily, is a perennial plant in the lily family (liliaceae) that grows at higher elevations of the Sonoran Desert regions of Arizona, western New Mexico, southern Utah, and Sonora.

Calochortus ambiguus is a bulb-forming herb. Flowers are white or very pale lavender, with a green center and reddish-purple anthers.

References

External links 
 
 Firefly Forest, Southeastern Arizona Wildflowers and Plants, Calochortus ambiguus – Doubting Mariposa Lily/
 Pacific Bulb Society, Calochortus Species One photos of several species
 Vascular Plants of the Gila Wilderness, Calochortus ambiguus (M.E. Jones) M. Ownbey (Doubting Mariposa Lily)

ambiguus
Flora of the Sonoran Deserts
Flora of Arizona
Flora of New Mexico
Flora of Sonora
Flora of Utah
Plants described in 1912
Flora without expected TNC conservation status